Tobias Halland Johannessen (born 23 August 1999) is a Norwegian road cyclist, who currently rides for UCI ProTeam .
Along with his twin brother Anders, Tobias raced in mountain biking, cyclo-cross and road cycling, before deciding to focus primarily on road racing. Knee injuries had kept him from competing in much of the truncated 2020 season. In July 2021 he named to the Norwegian team to compete in the road race event at the 2020 Summer Olympics.

Career
Johannessen began cycling alongside his brother Anders as a means of getting to school. He initially focussed on cyclo-cross and mountain biking before switching his focus to road racing, signing with the Uno-X development team for the 2021 season. In June 2021, Johannessen finished second in the General Classification of the Giro Ciclistico d'Italia, as well as finishing second on two individual stages. In August 2021, Johannessen won the Tour de l'Avenir after finishing first on consecutive summit finishes on Stages 7 and 8, winning the race by seven seconds over Carlos Rodríguez.

Johannessen raced the 2022 Tour of Norway, in which he took the leader's jersey after the second stage and eventually finished in fourth position, winning the Points classification. He also raced the 2022 Critérium du Dauphiné, in which he won the Young Rider Classification after finishing 10th overall, over a minute ahead of nearest challenger Brandon McNulty.

Major results

Road

2021
 1st  Overall Tour de l'Avenir
1st Stages 7 & 8
 2nd Overall Sazka Tour
1st Stages 3 & 4
 2nd Overall Giro Ciclistico d'Italia
 3rd Liège–Bastogne–Liège Espoirs
2022
 3rd Overall Étoile de Bessèges
1st  Young rider classification
1st Stage 4
 4th Overall Tour of Norway
1st  Points classification
 4th Mont Ventoux Dénivelé Challenge
 7th Overall Volta a Catalunya
 10th Overall Critérium du Dauphiné
1st  Young rider classification

General classification results timeline

Cyclo-cross
2016–2017
 2nd National Junior Championships
2017–2018
 1st  National Championships
2018–2019
 1st  National Championships
 1st Stockholm
2019–2020
 2nd National Championships
2021–2022
 1st  National Championships

Mountain Bike
2016
 3rd  Cross-country, UCI World Junior Championships

References

External links
 
 
 
 Tobias Halland Johannessen at MTB Data
 
 
 

1999 births
Living people
Norwegian male cyclists
Olympic cyclists of Norway
Cyclists at the 2020 Summer Olympics
Twin sportspeople
Norwegian twins
Cyclo-cross cyclists
People from Frogn